You Are a Widow, Sir is a 1971 Czechoslovak comedy science fiction film directed by Václav Vorlíček. It stars Iva Janžurová and Olga Schoberová.

External links
 
 

1971 films
1970s science fiction comedy films
Czechoslovak science fiction comedy films
Films directed by Václav Vorlíček
Czech science fiction comedy films
1971 comedy films
1970s Czech films